The Reincarnation of Golden Lotus (Chinese: 潘金蓮之前世今生) is a 1989 Hong Kong film directed by Clara Law and produced by Teddy Robin, and written by Lilian Lee. The film stars Joey Wong, Eric Tsang, Wilson Lam, Pal Sinn, and Ku Feng. The film premiered in Taiwan on 4 August 1989.

Plot
During Song Dynasty, Pan Jinlian was beheaded by the warder, she is reborn into the body of a baby girl named Shan Yulian, in Shanghai, after the Chinese Communist Revolution.

The war orphaned Shan Yulian at an early age. She graduated from Shanghai Arts School, majoring in Ballet.

In 1966, Mao Zedong launched the Cultural Revolution, Shan Yulian was brought to be persecuted and suffered political persecution by the CPC Government, she was raped by the President of Shanghai Dance Troupe. During the Down to the Countryside Movement, Shan Yulian was sent to the May Seventh Cadre Schools to work, she married a stupid farmer Wu Da, but she falls in love with Wu Da's brother, Wu Long, at the same time, Simon, who is a local playboy start to pursue her, and she falls into a love triangle with Wu Long and Simon.

Cast
 Joey Wong as Pan Jinlian/ Shan Yulian
 Eric Tsang as Wu Da
 Wilson Lam as Wu Long
 Pal Sinn as Simon
 Ku Feng

Release
The film was first released in Taiwan on 4 August 1989, and it was given a wider release on 16 February 1990.

The film was screened at the Toronto Festival of Festivals.

The film grossed $8,160,911.00 million.

Award

References

External links

Hong Kong erotic films
Films based on Jin Ping Mei
Films set in Shanghai
Hong Kong fantasy films
Films directed by Clara Law
Films with screenplays by Lilian Lee
1980s Hong Kong films